

Buildings and structures

Buildings

 1260
 Chartres Cathedral consecrated.
 Grey Abbey, Kildare
 1261
 St German's Priory Church, Cornwall, consecrated.
 Rebuilding of San Francesco, Pisa in Italy begun.
 1262 – Saint-Urbain Basilica, Troyes, begun.
 1263
 Romanesque St. Stephen's Cathedral, Vienna, consecrated.
 Siena Cathedral completed (dome 1264).
 1268 – Chennakesava Temple at Somanathapura in India (Hoysala Empire) built.
 1269 – Fakr ad-Din Mosque in the Sultanate of Mogadishu

Births 
 c. 1265 – Giotto di Bondone (died 1337)

References 

Architecture